The Skagit Valley lies in the northwestern corner of the state of Washington, United States.  Its defining feature is the Skagit River, which snakes through local communities which include the seat of Skagit County, Mount Vernon, as well as Sedro-Woolley, Concrete, Lyman-Hamilton, and Burlington.

The local newspaper is Skagit Valley Herald, published in Mount Vernon, Washington.

Between 1967 and 1983, there was a plan by Puget Sound Power and Light Co. to build two nuclear power plants in Skagit Valley, but due to controversy, these plans were shelved.

Tulip festival

The Skagit Valley Tulip Festival is a spring festival attended by thousands of visitors.

Music 
Several local musical groups, including the Fidalgo Youth Symphony and the Skagit Valley Chorale, bring together local amateur musicians from across the Skagit Valley.  In 2020, the Skagit Valley Chorale made international headlines during the COVID-19 pandemic in the United States when an infected person attended a choir rehearsal, before COVID-19 was known to be spreading in the local community.  As one of the clearest superspreading events early in the pandemic – choir members were able to tell researchers who stood next to whom throughout most of the evening – it was carefully studied by researchers, which resulted in recommendations used worldwide about how to avoid transmitting the virus.

Film 
The 2021 experimental horror film Skagit, written and directed by Nick Thompson, is set and shot entirely in the Skagit Valley.

References

Further reading
Tulipmania : the Skagit Valley Tulip Festival : official festival guidebook, 1989, 
Skagit Valley fare : a cookbook celebrating beauty and bounty in the Pacific Northwest, 1996,

External links

Skagit Valley Herald newspaper
Skagit Valley Hospital
Skagit Valley College Library
Skagit Valley Tulip Festival
Skagit Valley Official Tourism Website

Valleys of Washington (state)
Landforms of Skagit County, Washington